Salem Church (also known as German Evangelical Salem Church and Salem United Church of Christ) is a historic church in Sardis, Ohio.

It was built in 1891 and added to the National Register of Historic Places in 1992.

References

United Church of Christ churches in Ohio
Churches on the National Register of Historic Places in Ohio
Italianate architecture in Ohio
Churches completed in 1891
German-American culture in Ohio
Buildings and structures in Monroe County, Ohio
National Register of Historic Places in Monroe County, Ohio
Italianate church buildings in the United States